Narcine timlei, the blackspotted numbfish, black-spotted electric ray, Indian electric ray, largespotted numbfish or spotted numbfish, is a species of numbfish in the family Narcinidae.

Description
Narcine timlei grows to a maximum length of 38 cm. Antimicrobial compounds can be found in Narcine timlei. The epitopes of N.timlei have remained remarkably conserved throughout evolution.

Distribution
This species is found in coastal regions and also offshore in the Indo-West Pacific, from Pakistan to the Philippines. Narcine timlei is found in inshore marine waters and can withstand salinity up to 35 parts per thousand.

Parasites
Narcine timlei is host to a number of parasites including:
Charopinus narcinae Pillai, 1962
Caudacanthus narcini (Pillai, 1963)
Pseudocharopinus narcinae (Pillai, 1962)
Taeniacanthus narcini Pillai, 1963

References

timlei
Fish described in 1801